Nazareth Independent School District is a public school district based in Nazareth, Texas (USA).

Located in east central Castro County, the district has one school that serves students in grades kindergarten through twelve.

The school mascot is the swift, short for swift fox, which is native to the area.

Nazareth is the state's most dominant girls' basketball program, having won the most overall state championships (25: 1977, 1978, 1979, 1980, 1981, 1982, 1984, 1985, 1988, 1989, 1990, 1991, 1996, 2000, 2001, 2002, 2005, 2007, 2014, 2015, 2017, 2018, 2019, 2020, 2023), and the most consecutive (6, from 1977 through 1982) of any school in any classification.  The boys have won six titles of their own—1986, 2002, 2003, 2006, 2007, and 2010.

In 2009, the school district was rated "recognized" by the Texas Education Agency.

References

External links
Nazareth ISD

School districts in Castro County, Texas